Bozzano is a surname. Notable people with this surname include:

 Ernesto Bozzano, also known as Signor Bozzano (186 –1943), Italian medium, parapsychologist and spiritualist
 Giacomo "Mino" Bozzano (1933-2008), former Italian boxer and medalist
 José Alfredo Bozzano Baglietto (1895–1969), Paraguayan military engineer and senior officer of the Army
 Damião de Bozzano (born Pio Giannotti; 1898-1997), Italian Roman Catholic priest and a Capuchin missionary in Brazil

Italian-language surnames